The Capital Pathway, also known informally as the Bike Path, is a  recreational pathway interlinking many parks, waterways and sites in Ottawa, Ontario and Gatineau, Quebec.  Most of the pathway is paved, and allows an almost continuous route through the National Capital Region.

The pathway was mostly the work of the National Capital Commission (NCC), a crown corporation created in 1959. The trail, which includes the Rideau Canal Pathway, the Ottawa River Pathway, and the Rideau River Pathway extends in all directions to the limits of the city of Ottawa and extends northward into Gatineau Park's lakes.

History
The Capital Pathway was a project of the National Capital Commission as part of their improvements to the National Capital Region. The NCC was created by an act of parliament in 1959.

The first section built was the Ottawa River Pathway in the early 1970s.

The majority of the pathway continues to be maintained by the NCC.

The section of the Ottawa River Pathway between Acres Road and Moodie Drive was paved in 2009.

Routes

Ottawa River Pathway
The Ottawa River Pathway very long pathway is along the south bank of almost the entire length Ottawa's portion of the Ottawa River.  In the east it goes to the beach at Petrie Island at Tenth Line Road and the Ottawa River. Going westward, it meets up with the pathway along the Aviation parkway which is at the Aviation Museum.  Further along, it becomes a part of the Trans Canada Trail / The Great Trail as it winds through Rockcliffe Park to the residence of the Prime Minister at 24 Sussex Drive and Rideau Hall the residence of the Governor General. It then passes Major's Hill Park (near the bridge) on towards the back side of Parliament Hill where it bypasses the pathways on the Rideau Canal. 

Moving westward, it bypasses the War Museum in LeBreton Flats and goes to first Westboro Beach, then Brittania Beach, Moodie Drive and beyond to end at Shirleys Bay.

Rideau Canal Pathway

The most well known of all the sections of the Capital Pathway is the Rideau Canal section. Its downtown location attracts tourists and residents, frequently used for walking, cycling, and running. It continues to be popular in the winter, as the Rideau Canal is widely known as one of the longest skating rinks in the world, with 6 to 8 km of skatable surface on most days in January.

The Rideau Canal Pathway's most northerly point is where the canal empties into the Ottawa River. Immediately beside the locks is the Bytown Museum. There actually are two separate paths, on each side of the canal. One encircles Dow's Lake and path users frequently cross to the other side near Carleton University, just south of the lake.

The trail extends to Hog's Back Falls which also provides a crossing. This is the point where the canal meets the Rideau river and the trail continues on its east side until Mooney's Bay Park. South of that it resumes, continuing to Ottawa's south boundary.

Rideau River Pathway
The Rideau River Pathway pathway is almost unknown by tourists but frequented by residents.  It starts at Rideau Falls where the Rideau River meets the Ottawa River.  It goes southward through New Edinburgh then along Riverside Drive until it reaches Billings Bridge.  Here is a park where ducks frequent. From Billings Bridge, it continues south until it meets up with the Rideau Canal at the Hog's Back Falls. The more well-known part is on the east side of the Rideau River.

Other routes
Besides the Rideau Canal Pathway, Ottawa River Pathway, and Rideau River Pathway, the following pathways are also part of the Capital Pathway in Ottawa:

Watts Creek Pathway 
Pinecrest Creek Pathway
Experimental Farm Pathway
Aviation Pathway
Greenbelt Pathway

The Capital Pathway also include several routes in Quebec. Aylmer is home to an effective and generally well-maintained network of bicycle paths that encircle the central portion of the area and run past many scenic locations, such as the Aylmer Marina and the Deschênes Rapids.

The bike trail becomes very steep going northwards into Gatineau Park.  Pink Lake is directly on the path.  Other lakes such Kingsmere Lake are accessible.  The Champlain Lookout provides a good view of lands to the west of the city of Ottawa from a high elevation.

Safety
Despite the National Capital Region having a very low crime rate, attention has been given to safety on the pathway.  The pathway is dark at night, has places where traffic may be hazardous, and has been involved in the investigation of more than one homicide.

The Pathway patrol is a volunteer organization based in Ottawa, Ontario. Trained volunteer patrollers cycle, in-line skate, or walk along Ottawa's recreational pathways to promote active living, improve safety and security, and to encourage courtesy among all users. Areas patrolled span the NCC pathways in the west from Andrew Haydon Park through Britannia Park, east along the Ottawa River Pathway to Petrie Island, The Rideau Canal (downtown to Mooney's Bay), The Rideau River (Sussex Drive to Mooney's Bay) and within City of Ottawa parks in the Greenboro area. In 2010, Kanata was added to the patrol region.

In 2003, Ardeth Wood disappeared from a pathway near Rockcliffe Parkway starting a large search effort, and resulting in a homicide conviction. There have also been more than one criminal incident on pathways in Gatineau.

See also

Cycling in Canada
Greenbelt (Ottawa)
List of cycleways

References

External links
 
 Cycling - City of Ottawa
 Ottawa’s Multi Use Pathway Pocket Map Version (hansonthebike.com)
 Citizens for Safe Cycling  - Ottawa's bicycle advocacy group since 1983-4
 Map My Ride  shows cycling trails mapped by registered users 
Bikemap.net - User recommended cycling routes and bike maps for in and around Ottawa
 GoBiking.ca - Cycling in Ottawa-Gatineau (including Ontario and Quebec and beyond)
Ottawa Bicycle Club
Explore Ontario by Bike - Ottawa
 

Cycleways in Canada
Regional parks of Canada
Bike paths in Ontario
Bike paths in Quebec
Tourist attractions in Ottawa
Parks in Gatineau
Tourist attractions in Quebec